The men's 1500 metres speed skating competition of the 2014 Winter Olympics was held at Adler Arena Skating Center on 15 February 2014.

The 2010 Olympic champion, Mark Tuitert of the Netherlands, sought to defend his title; he bettered the track record, but eventually finished fifth. Poland's Zbigniew Bródka won the gold medal, the Netherlands' Koen Verweij took silver, and Canada's Denny Morrison took the bronze. After Verweij's race in the last pair of the event, it took about half a minute before it was announced that Bródka had beaten Verweij's time by 3 thousandths of a second, which is 4.1 cm, given the finishing speed of Verweij being 49.4 km/h. Measurements in thousandths were only introduced in speed skating after the 2010 Olympics, so this was the closest win in Olympic speed skating history. Two comparably narrow victories had previously been recorded at the Olympics overall. At the 1998 Winter Olympics, Silke Kraushaar beat her teammate Barbara Niedernhuber by 0.002 seconds in the Women's luge event, while at the 1972 Summer Olympics Karl Gunnar Larsson beat Tim McKee by 0.002 seconds in the 400 meters individual swimming medley. The latter narrow win in effect brought about a change so that no swimming competition henceforward would have to be decided by a margin less than a hundredth of a second.

The gold medal awarded in this event featured a Chelyabinsk meteor fragment to commemorate the first anniversary of this meteor strike.

Qualification
A total of forty speed skaters could qualify for this distance, with a maximum of four skaters per country. The top 20 of the men's 1500 metres World Cup standings after World Cup 4 in Berlin secured a spot for their country. Then the additional 20 spots were awarded based on a time ranking of all times skated in the World Cup. A reserve list was also made.

Competition schedule
All times are (UTC+4).

Records
Prior to this competition, the existing world and Olympic records were as follows.

At the 2013 World Single Distance Speed Skating Championships the track record was set by Denis Yuskov at 1:46,32. At the 2013–14 Russian Single Distance Championships Yuskov improved this track record skating 1:45.85.

The following records were set during this competition.

TR = track record

Results
The races were started at 17:30.

TR = track record

References

Men's speed skating at the 2014 Winter Olympics